The Mossberg MC1sc is a semi-automatic subcompact handgun introduced by O.F. Mossberg & Sons in January 2019. Chambered in 9×19mm Parabellum and rated for +P pressure, it is the company's first handgun offering since the Mossberg Brownie was introduced 100 years prior.

Features

The MC1sc is a striker-fired polymer frame pistol, featuring an integrated blade safety on the trigger. Its standard three-dot sights are adjustable, both front and rear, with night sights available as an option.

The standard slide is stainless steel, with "diamond-like carbon coating" available as an option. Disassembling the pistol for cleaning does not require pulling the trigger, as Mossberg's "safe takedown system" allows the striker assembly to be removed before removing the slide.

Several MC1sc offerings are available, including ones with a cross-bolt safety. Single-stack magazines with 6-round and 7-round capacities are available; both are made with clear polymer and have an orange floor plate. Additionally, the MC1sc will accept Glock 43 magazines. The magazine release is reversible.

MC2c variant

On January 17, 2020, Mossberg introduced the MC2c, a slightly larger version of the MC1sc. The "c" designates it as a compact size pistol, as compared to the "sc" (subcompact) size of the MC1sc. The MC2c features double-stack magazines, in either 13-round (flush fit) or 15-round (extended) capacities.

References

External links
 MC1sc video by Mossberg
 MC2c video by Mossberg

MC1sc
9mm Parabellum semi-automatic pistols
Semi-automatic pistols of the United States